The Stronger Tour was the sixth headlining tour by American pop recording artist Kelly Clarkson. Beginning on January 13, 2012, the tour supported her fifth studio album, Stronger (2011). With over fifty dates, the tour traveled to the Americas, Australia and Europe. It ended on October 20, 2012, in London, England.

The tour grossed $7.4M in the US with 43 dates.

Background
During an interview with MTV News, Clarkson stated a tour was being planned for "sometime in 2012". The tour was officially announced on November 14, 2011 with over 30 shows in the United States and Canada. Joining the singer on tour is Matt Nathanson as the opening act on select shows. Clarkson mentioned she was looking forward to performing "Stronger (What Doesn't Kill You)". She explained, "I can't wait to perform What Doesn't Kill You. We've already rehearsed it, and it's so much fun. It's like this big dance anthem". For the show, Clarkson asked her fans to votes to requests on Twitter.

Opening acts
Matt Nathanson (North America) (select dates)
Carolina Liar (North America) (select dates)
The Fray (Australia)
Sarah De Bono (Australia)
Cover Drive (Europe)

Setlist
{{hidden
| headercss = background: #ccccff; font-size: 100%; width: 59%;
| contentcss = text-align: left; font-size: 100%; width: 75%;
| header = North America
| content = January 13 – April 14, 2012
"Dark Side"
"Behind These Hazel Eyes"
"Since U Been Gone"
"Gone"
"You Love Me"
"Heavy in Your Arms"  
Fan Request
Medley: "The Trouble With Love Is" / "Walk Away" / "How I Feel" / "I Want You"
"I Know You Won't"  
"Einstein"
"Don't You Wanna Stay"
"Let Me Down"
"I Forgive You"
"Already Gone"
"Breakaway"
"You Still Won't Know What It's Like"
"Stronger (What Doesn't Kill You)"
"Never Again"
"Because of You"
Encore
"My Life Would Suck Without You"
"Mr. Know It All"
"Miss Independent"
Source:

Notes
During the concert at the Radio City Music Hall, Clarkson performed "I'd Rather Go Blind".
During her concert in Grand Prairie, Clarkson sang  Bonnie Raitt's "Something To Talk About" with her friend April Beck.
During the concert in Los Angeles Clarkson performed "When You Believe" with Tamyra Gray, "Leave the Pieces" with Michelle Branch, "Don't You Wanna Stay" with Blake Shelton and "Because of You" with Reba McEntire.

}}
{{hidden
| headercss = background: #ccccff; font-size: 100%; width: 59%;
| contentcss = text-align: left; font-size: 100%; width: 75%;
| header = Australia/Europe
| content = September 25 – October 20, 2012
"My Life Would Suck Without You"
Behind These Hazel Eyes"
"I Forgive You"
"Dark Side"
"Walk Away"
"You Love Me"
"We Are Young" 
Already Gone"
Don't You Wanna Stay"
Fan request
"Because of You"
"Catch My Breath"
"Let Me Down"
"Breakaway"
"Since U Been Gone"
Encore
"Never Again"
"Mr. Know It All"
"Miss Independent"
"What Doesn't Kill You (Stronger)"

Notes
In Perth, Clarkson, The Fray & Sarah De Bono all sang fun.'s "Some Nights".
"Catch My Breath" was only performed in Europe.
}}

Fan requests

Tour dates
{| class="wikitable" style="text-align:center;"
!width="175"| Date
!width="150"| City  
!width="150"| Country
!width="250"| Venue
|-
!colspan="5" | North America
|-
|January 13, 2012
|Mashantucket
|rowspan="21"|United States
|MGM Grand Theater
|-
|January 15, 2012
|Atlantic City
|Etess Arena
|-
|January 17, 2012
|Albany
|Times Union Center
|-
|January 19, 2012
|Verona
|Turning Stone Event Center
|-
|January 21, 2012
|New York City
|Radio City Music Hall
|-
|January 24, 2012
|Manchester
|Verizon Wireless Arena
|-
|January 26, 2012
|Boston
|Wang Theatre
|-
|January 28, 2012
|Johnstown
|Cambria County War Memorial Arena
|-
|January 31, 2012
|Durham
|Durham Performing Arts Center
|-
|February 2, 2012
|Jacksonville
|Moran Theater
|-
|February 4, 2012
|Bossier City
|Riverdome
|-
|February 6, 2012
|San Antonio
|Majestic Theatre
|-
|February 8, 2012
|Austin
|Long Center for the Performing Arts
|-
|February 10, 2012
|Grand Prairie
|Verizon Theatre
|-
|February 14, 2012
|Biloxi
|Hard Rock Live
|-
|February 16, 2012
|Hollywood
|Hard Rock Live
|-
|February 18, 2012{{efn|The show on February 18, 2012, was a part of Mardi Gras at Universal Studios.}}
|Orlando
|Universal Music Plaza Stage
|-
|February 21, 2012
|Clearwater
|Ruth Eckerd Hall
|-
|February 23, 2012
|Atlanta
|Fox Theatre
|-
|February 25, 2012
|Champaign
|Assembly Hall
|-
|February 28, 2012
|Greenville
|Timmons Arena
|-
|March 2, 2012
|rowspan="2"|Niagara Falls
|rowspan="4"|Canada
|rowspan="2"|Avalon Ballroom Theatre
|-
|March 3, 2012
|-
|March 6, 2012
|London
|John Labatt Centre
|-
|March 8, 2012
|Windsor
|The Colosseum at Caesars Windsor
|-
|March 10, 2012
|Hammond
|rowspan="17"|United States
|The Venue at Horseshoe Casino
|-
|March 12, 2012
|Sioux Falls
|Sioux Falls Arena
|-
|March 14, 2012
|Springfield
|O'Reilly Family Event Center
|-
|March 16, 2012
|St. Louis
|Fox Theatre
|-
|March 18, 2012
|Broomfield
|1stBank Center
|-
|March 20, 2012
|West Valley City
|Maverik Center
|-
|March 22, 2012
|Kent
|ShoWare Center
|-
|March 24, 2012
|Boise
|Taco Bell Arena
|-
|March 27, 2012
|San Jose
|Event Center Arena
|-
|March 29, 2012
|Bakersfield
|Rabobank Arena
|-
|March 31, 2012
|Reno
|Reno Events Center
|-
|April 3, 2012
|Los Angeles
|Nokia Theatre
|-
|April 5, 2012
|Las Vegas
|Pearl Concert Theater
|-
|April 7, 2012
|Indio
|Fantasy Springs Special Events Center
|-
|April 10, 2012
|San Diego
|Valley View Casino Center
|-
|April 13, 2012
|Wenatchee
|Town Toyota Center
|-
|April 14, 2012
|Pullman
|Beasley Coliseum
|-
!colspan="5"| Europe
|-
|June 9, 2012
|London
|England
|Wembley Stadium
|-
!colspan="5" | South America
|-
|June 23, 2012
|São Paulo
|Brazil
|Arena Anhembi
|-
!colspan="5" | North America
|-
|June 29, 2012
|Milwaukee
|United States
|Marcus Amphitheater
|-
!colspan="5" | Australia
|-
|September 25, 2012
|Brisbane
|rowspan="6"|Australia
|Brisbane Entertainment Centre
|-
|September 27, 2012
|Sydney
|Sydney Entertainment Centre
|-
|September 29, 2012
|Deniliquin
|Deni Freighters Sports Arena
|-
|October 1, 2012
|Melbourne
|Rod Laver Arena
|-
|October 3, 2012
|Adelaide
|Adelaide Entertainment Centre
|-
|October 5, 2012
|Perth
|Challenge Stadium
|-
!colspan="5" | Europe
|-
|October 10, 2012
|Dublin
|Ireland
|The O2
|-
|October 12, 2012
|Manchester
|rowspan="2"|England
|Manchester Arena
|-
|October 14, 2012
|Birmingham
|LG Arena
|-
|October 16, 2012
|Glasgow
|Scotland
|Braehead Arena
|-
|October 18, 2012
|Sheffield
|rowspan="2"|England
|Motorpoint Arena Sheffield
|-
|October 20, 2012
|London
|Wembley Arena
|}

Festivals and other miscellaneous performances

Box office score data

PersonnelThe Band 
Kelly Clarkson – Lead vocals
Aben Eubanks – Guitar, backup vocals
Cory Churko – Guitar, violin, backup vocals 
Chris Rodriguez – Guitar, backup vocals 
Einar Pedersen – Bass,  backup vocals 
Jason Halbert– Keyboards, musical director 
Miles McPherson – Drums
Jill Pickering – Backup vocalist, guitar
Kate Rapier – Backup vocalist, assistant
Nicole Hurst – Backup vocalistThe Glam TeamAshley Donovan – Makeup & hair
Steph Ashmore – Stylist
Layne Lewis – WardrobeThe CrewDennis Sharp – Tour manager
Alan Hornall – Production manager
Christopher Dye-Technical director
Jim Collins – Tour accountant 
Harold Behrens – Stage manager
Tricia Farrow – Production assistant
Brian Butner – Security
Chris Michaelessi – FOH engineer
Robert Miller – Monitor engineer
Bryan Jones – Guitar tech
James Fridley – Guitar tech
Peter Moffett – Drum tech
Douglas McKinley – Audio system tech
Jeffrey Wuerth – Audio system tech
Kevin Gorge – Audio crew

Chris Berry – Audio crew
Fraser MacKeen – Lighting director
Leroy Bennett – Production lighting manager
Ron Schilling – Lighting crew chief 
Ben Meserole – Lighting tech
Jessica Quinn – Lighting tech
Wade Cotton – Lighting tech
Cory FitzGerald – Lighting programmer
William Parisien – Video director
Nathaniel Fountain –  Projectionist
Nick Strand – Projectionist 
Stephen Haskins – Video tech
Randall Ice – Video tech
Martin Capiraso – Head carpenter
Michael Kinnard – Carpenter
Bob Powers – RiggerOther'Narvel Blackstock & Starstruck Management – Management
Flood, Bumstead, McCreedy & McCarthy Inc. & Kristen Braaksma – Business management
CAA & Darryl Eaton – Booking agency
Preferred Travel – Travel agency 
NPB Companies, Inc. – Security
Upstaging Inc. – Lighting 
Clair Brothers, 8th Day Sound – Sound
Tait Towers – Staging/Set 
Chaos Visual Productions – Video company
Janco Ltd. – Trucking
Rockit Cargo – Freight
Rich Koffer & Bravado – Merchandise 

Critical reception
The show has received universal critical acclaim, praising Clarkson's vocals, as well as the production of the show and the set list. Michele Amabile from The Hollywood Reporter says that "Clarkson's personable nature and powerhouse vocals prove that she is growing stronger with each album and tour." Kevin McSheffrey from Boston Music Spotlight said "The Wang was sold out and Clarkson's adoring fans stood throughout the performance, dancing along to lively tunes like Since U Been Gone and new single What Doesn’t Kill You (Stronger), while still standing for ballads such as You Still Won’t Know What It's Like and Don’t You Wanna Stay, complete with Jason Aldean appearing virtually through a curtain screen." Glenn Gamboa from the Long Island Newsday stated "That Clarkson can transform that pain into something so beautiful and a concert so enjoyable shows that she is so much more than a great singer. She's a great artist". Greg Haymes from Timesunion.com said "While the simple but versatile stage set (featuring her backing musicians on two multi-level platforms) and the lighting both dazzled, they never over-powered Clarkson and her strong, supple voice". After performing close to her hometown in Dallas, Texas, Rich Lopez from Dallasvoice.com stated "She really is the girl next door with her aw shucks sassy and fun demeanor. Every little comment she made about being home resulted in deafening roars and she punctuated her homegrown flavor with a thick "kuntry" accent. Clarkson was without any doubt, the homecoming queen for the night". Preston Jones from dfw.com called I Know You Won't and Don't You Wanna Stay the songs that stood out the most in her show in Dallas, and also added: The combination of her personable nature with songs expressing deep vulnerability gave a jolt of feeling to a show that often felt like a giddy karaoke party in a superstar's living room.''

External links
Clarkson's Official Website

References

2012 concert tours
Kelly Clarkson concert tours